Jacqui Katona is a western-educated Aboriginal Australian woman who led the campaign to stop the Jabiluka uranium mine in the Northern Territory.  In 1998 the Mirrar Aboriginal people, together with environmental groups, used peaceful on-site civil disobedience to create one of the largest blockades in Australia's history. Katona won the 1999 U.S. Goldman Environmental Prize, with Yvonne Margarula, in recognition of efforts to protect their country and culture against uranium mining.

See also
Energy Resources of Australia
List of Australian inquiries into uranium mining
Uranium mining in Kakadu National Park
Uranium in the environment
Women and the environment through history

References

External links
Yes to land rights! No to uranium mining!
Anti-nuke protests
Indigenous Leaders Call For End To Uranium Mining

Australian environmentalists
Australian women environmentalists
Australian indigenous rights activists
Women human rights activists
Australian women activists
Australian anti-uranium activists
Living people
Year of birth missing (living people)
Goldman Environmental Prize awardees